Thai League 3 Play-off Round is last promotion quota of Thai League 2. Thai Football clubs, which is runner-up of 2017 Thai League 3 Upper Region and runner-up of 2017 Thai League 3 Lower Region, pass to 2017 Thai League 3 Play-off Round. This round plays Home-Away match. Thai Football clubs get more total scores when finish Home-Away match to promote Thai League 2. Away goals rule is used to this tournament.

3rd Position of Play-off round

|-
|}

1st Position of Play-off round

|-
|}

Winner

References

 Official T3 Play-off rule
 http://www.thailandsusu.com/webboard/index.php?topic=386949.0
 http://www.thailandsusu.com/webboard/index.php?topic=386920.0
 http://www.smmsport.com/reader.php?news=205310
 http://www.smmsport.com/reader.php?news=205270
 http://www.smmsport.com/reader.php?news=205603
 http://www.smmsport.com/reader.php?news=205641
 http://www.thailandsusu.com/webboard/index.php?topic=387058.0
 http://www.thailandsusu.com/webboard/index.php?topic=387074.0

External links
 official web of T3 Play-off round

Thai League 3
2017 in Thai football leagues